Pape Abdou Paye (born 31 May 1990) is a French professional footballer who last played as a right-back for Morocco Botola club IR Tanger.

Career
In January 2019, he moved to AS Nancy.

Personal life
Born in France, Paye is of Senegalese descent.

References

External links
 
 
 

1990 births
Living people
Footballers from Lyon
Association football fullbacks
French footballers
French sportspeople of Senegalese descent
Ligue 2 players
Dijon FCO players
FC Lorient players
Football Bourg-en-Bresse Péronnas 01 players
AS Nancy Lorraine players
FC Sochaux-Montbéliard players